Glenda Jackson is an English actress of the stage and screen. She is one of the few actresses who have won the Triple Crown of Acting, which is the highest awards for film, television and theatre. She has received 2 Academy Awards, 2 Primetime Emmy Awards, and a Tony Award.

For her performances in film Jackson has received two Academy Awards for Best Actress for her performances on Women in Love (1970), and A Touch of Class (1973). She also received nominations for Sunday Bloody Sunday (1971), and Hedda (1975). She also received three British Academy Film Award nominations winning for Sunday Bloody Sunday. She also received eight Golden Globe Award nominations winning for A Touch of Class. For her work in television she has received two Primetime Emmy Awards for Outstanding Lead Actress in a Drama Series and Outstanding Single Performance by an Actress in a Leading Role for portraying Queen Elizabeth I in the BBC series Elizabeth R (1971) and an International Emmy Award for the BBC One series Elizabeth Is Missing (2020). She also received three British Academy Television Award nominations winning for Elizabeth Is Missing. 

For her work in theatre she has received various awards including a Tony Award, a Drama Desk Award, an Evening Standard Theatre Award, a Drama League Award and two Critics Circle Theatre Awards. She received five Tony Award nominations for her performances in Marat/Sade in 1966, Rose in 1981, Strange Interlude in 1985, and Macbeth in 1988. She won for Best Actress in a Play for the Broadway revival of Edward Albee's Three Tall Women in 2018. She also received five Laurence Olivier Award nominations for Stevie in 1977, Antony and Cleopatra in 1979, Rose in 1980, Strange Interlude in 1984, and King Lear in 2017.

Major associations

Academy Awards

BAFTA Awards

Emmy Awards

Golden Globe Awards

Tony Awards

Theatre awards

Critics' Circle Theatre Awards

Drama Desk Awards

Drama League Awards

Evening Standard Theatre Awards

Laurence Olivier Awards

Other awards

British Academy Scotland Awards

British Independent Film Awards

Cannes Film Festival Awards

David di Donatello Awards

Étoile de Cristal (French Film Academy)

Evening News Awards

Evening Standard British Film Awards

Montreal Film Festival Award

National Board of Review Awards

National Society of Film Critics

New York Drama Critics' Circle Awards

New York Film Critics Circle Awards

Plays and Players Awards

Rio de Janeiro Film Festival Awards

San Sebastián International Film Festival

Variety Awards

Variety Club of Great Britain Awards

See also 

 List of Glenda Jackson performances

Notes

References

Lists of awards received by British actor